Mark Brain, born January 30, 1978, in Paderborn, Germany, is a DJ and producer in electronic music (House, Electro, Progressive).

Discography

Singles
 2009 - Mark Brain - Datacity (Turning Wheel Records)
 2004 - Mark Brain - Datacity (Schallpark)
 2004 - Brain Inc. - The Orange Theme (Schallpark)
 2003 - Mark Brain - Ease the pressure / Los Ninos del parque (Alphabet City)
 2003 - Brain Inc. - Running Man (Schallpark)
 2002 - Mark Brain - Radical (Alphabet City)
 2001 - Mark Brain - Stonehenge (Alphabet City)
 2000 - Mark Brain & Tom Mayah - Basepower (4 the music)
 2000 - Mark Brain & Tom Mayah - Step Tech
 2000 - Mark Brain & Tom Mayah - Union Crowd Theme

Remixes
 2001 - Powell - I am ready (Mark Brain Remix)
 2001 - Badlands - Let them know (Mark Brain & Tom Mayah Remix)
 2000 - The Groove Town Gang - Ain't no mountain high enough (Mark Brain & Tom Mayah Clubbin' Mix)

External links
 Official Website Mark Brain
 LastFM Mark Brain at LastFM
 The DJ List Mark Brain at The DJ List
 Discogs Mark Brain at Discogs
 YouTube Video Mark Brain -live- in Shanghai
 YouTube Video Mark Brain -live- in Sat1 Interview during his performance at Eins Live Love Express on the way to the Love Parade
 Label Schallpark Recordings
 Label Alphabet City

German DJs
1978 births
Living people
German house musicians
People from Paderborn
Electronic dance music DJs